In quantum mechanics, a density matrix (or density operator) is a matrix that describes the quantum state of a physical system. It allows for the calculation of the probabilities of the outcomes of any measurement performed upon this system, using the Born rule. It is a generalization of the more usual state vectors or wavefunctions: while those can only represent pure states, density matrices can also represent mixed states. Mixed states arise in quantum mechanics in two different situations: first when the preparation of the system is not fully known, and thus one must deal with a statistical ensemble of possible preparations, and second when one wants to describe a physical system which is entangled with another, without describing their combined state.

Density matrices are thus crucial tools in areas of quantum mechanics that deal with mixed states, such as quantum statistical mechanics, open quantum systems, quantum decoherence, and quantum information.

Definition and motivation 
The density matrix is a representation of a linear operator called the density operator. The density matrix is obtained from the density operator by choice of basis in the underlying space. In practice, the terms density matrix and density operator are often used interchangeably.

In operator language, a density operator for a system is a positive semi-definite, Hermitian operator of trace one acting on the Hilbert space of the system. This definition can be motivated by considering a situation where a pure state  is prepared with probability , known as an ensemble. The probability of obtaining projective measurement result  when using projectors  is given by

which makes the density operator, defined as  

a convenient representation for the state of this ensemble. It is easy to check that this operator is positive semi-definite, Hermitian, and has trace one. However, this representation will not be unique, as shown by the Schrödinger–HJW theorem.

Another motivation for the definition of density operators comes from considering local measurements on entangled states. Let  be a pure entangled state in the composite Hilbert space . The probability of obtaining measurement result  when measuring projectors  on the Hilbert space  alone is given by

where  denotes the partial trace over the Hilbert space . This makes the operator 

a convenient tool to calculate the probabilities of these local measurements. It is easy to check that this operator has all the properties of a density operator.

Pure and mixed states
A pure quantum state is a state that can not be written as a probabilistic mixture, or convex combination, of other quantum states. There are several equivalent characterizations of pure states in the language of density operators. A density operator represents a pure state if and only if:
 it can be written as an outer product of a state vector  with itself, that is, 
 it is a projection, in particular of rank one.
 it is idempotent, that is 
 it has purity one, that is, 

It is important to emphasize the difference between a probabilistic mixture of quantum states and their superposition.

On the other hand, a quantum superposition of these two states with equal probability amplitudes results in the pure state  with density matrix 

Unlike the probabilistic mixture, this superposition can display quantum interference.

 Geometrically, the set of density operators is a convex set, and the pure states are the extremal points of that set. The simplest case is that of a two-dimensional Hilbert space, known as a qubit. An arbitrary state for a qubit can be written as a linear combination of the Pauli matrices, which together with the identity matrix provide a basis for  self-adjoint matrices:

where the real numbers  are the coordinates of a point within the unit ball and

Points with  represent pure states, while mixed states are represented by points in the interior. This is known as the Bloch sphere picture of qubit state space.

Example: light polarization 

An example of pure and mixed states is light polarization. An individual photon
Consider now a vertically polarized photon, described by the state . If we pass it through a circular polarizer which allows either only  polarized light, or only  polarized light, half of the photons are absorbed in both cases. This may make it seem like half of the photons are in state  and the other half in state , but this is not correct: if we pass  through a linear polarizer there's no absorption whatsoever, but if we pass either state  or  half of the photons are absorbed.

Unpolarized light (such as the light from an incandescent light bulb) cannot be described as any state of the form  (linear, circular, or elliptical polarization). Unlike polarized light, it passes through a polarizer with 50% intensity loss whatever the orientation of the polarizer; and it cannot be made polarized by passing it through any wave plate. However, unpolarized light can be described as a statistical ensemble, e. g. as each photon having either  polarization or  polarization with probability 1/2. The same behavior would occur if each photon had either vertical polarization  or horizontal polarization  with probability 1/2. These two ensembles are completely indistinguishable experimentally, and therefore they are considered the same mixed state. For this example of unpolarized light, the density operator equals

There are also other ways to generate unpolarized light: one possibility is to introduce uncertainty in the preparation of the photon, for example, passing it through a birefringent crystal with a rough surface, so that slightly different parts of the light beam acquire different polarizations. Another possibility is using entangled states: a radioactive decay can emit two photons traveling in opposite directions, in the quantum state . The joint state of the two photons together is pure, but the density matrix for each photon individually, found by taking the partial trace of the joint density matrix, is completely mixed.

Equivalent ensembles and purifications 

A given density operator does not uniquely determine which ensemble of pure states gives rise to it; in general there are infinitely many different ensembles generating the same density matrix. Those cannot be distinguished by any measurement. The equivalent ensembles can be completely characterized: let  be an ensemble. Then for any complex matrix  such that  (a partial isometry), the ensemble  defined by

will give rise to the same density operator, and all equivalent ensembles are of this form.

A closely related fact is that a given density operator has infinitely many different purifications, which are pure states that generate the density operator when a partial trace is taken. Let 

be the density operator generated by the ensemble , with states  not necessarily orthogonal. Then for all partial isometries  we have that

Measurement 
Let  be an observable of the system, and suppose the ensemble is in a mixed state such that each of the pure states  occurs with probability . Then the corresponding density operator equals

The expectation value of the measurement can be calculated by extending from the case of pure states:

where  denotes trace. Thus, the familiar expression  for pure states is replaced by

for mixed states.

Moreover, if  has spectral resolution

where  is the projection operator into the eigenspace corresponding to eigenvalue , the post-measurement density operator is given by

when outcome i is obtained. In the case where the measurement result is not known the ensemble is instead described by

If one assumes that the probabilities of measurement outcomes are linear functions of the projectors , then they must be given by the trace of the projector with a density operator. Gleason's theorem shows that in Hilbert spaces of dimension 3 or larger the assumption of linearity can be replaced with an assumption of non-contextuality. This restriction on the dimension can be removed by assuming non-contextuality for POVMs as well, but this has been criticized as physically unmotivated.

Entropy 
Then the entropy of a quantum system with density matrix  is

This definition implies that the von Neumann entropy of any pure state is zero. If  are states that have support on orthogonal subspaces, then the von Neumann entropy of a convex combination of these states,

is given by the von Neumann entropies of the states  and the Shannon entropy of the probability distribution :

When the states  do not have orthogonal supports, the sum on the right-hand side is strictly greater than the von Neumann entropy of the convex combination .

Given a density operator  and a projective measurement as in the previous section, the state  defined by the convex combination

The von Neumann equation for time evolution 

Just as the Schrödinger equation describes how pure states evolve in time, the von Neumann equation (also known as the Liouville–von Neumann equation) describes how a density operator evolves in time. The von Neumann equation dictates that

where the brackets denote a commutator.

This equation only holds when the density operator is taken to be in the Schrödinger picture, even though this equation seems at first look to emulate the Heisenberg equation of motion in the Heisenberg picture, with a crucial sign difference:

where  is some Heisenberg picture operator; but in this picture the density matrix is not time-dependent, and the relative sign ensures that the time derivative of the expected value  comes out the same as in the Schrödinger picture.

If the Hamiltonian is time-independent, the von Neumann equation can be easily solved to yield

For a more general Hamiltonian, if  is the wavefunction propagator over some interval, then the time evolution of the density matrix over that same interval is given by

Wigner functions and classical analogies 

The density matrix operator may also be realized in phase space. Under the Wigner map, the density matrix transforms into the equivalent Wigner function,

The equation for the time evolution of the Wigner function, known as Moyal equation, is then the Wigner-transform of the above von Neumann equation,

The evolution equation for the Wigner function is then analogous to that of its classical limit, the Liouville equation of classical physics.  In the limit of vanishing Planck's constant ,  reduces to the classical Liouville probability density function in phase space.

Example applications 
Density matrices are a basic tool of quantum mechanics, and appear at least occasionally in almost any type of quantum-mechanical calculation. Some specific examples where density matrices are especially helpful and common are as follows:
 Statistical mechanics uses density matrices, most prominently to express the idea that a system is prepared at a nonzero temperature. The normalization condition that the trace of  be equal to 1 defines the partition function to be . If the number of particles involved in the system is itself not certain, then a grand canonical ensemble can be applied, where the states summed over to make the density matrix are drawn from a Fock space.
 Quantum decoherence theory typically involves non-isolated quantum systems developing entanglement with other systems, including measurement apparatuses. Density matrices make it much easier to describe the process and calculate its consequences. Quantum decoherence explains why a system interacting with an environment transitions from being a pure state, exhibiting superpositions, to a mixed state, an incoherent combination of classical alternatives. This transition is fundamentally reversible, as the combined state of system and environment is still pure, but for all practical purposes irreversible, as the environment is a very large and complex quantum system, and it is not feasible to reverse their interaction. Decoherence is thus very important for explaining the classical limit of quantum mechanics, but cannot explain wave function collapse, as all classical alternatives are still present in the mixed state, and wave function collapse selects only one of them.
 Similarly, in quantum computation, quantum information theory, open quantum systems, and other fields where state preparation is noisy and decoherence can occur, density matrices are frequently used. Noise is often modelled via a depolarizing channel or an amplitude damping channel. Quantum tomography is a process by which, given a set of data representing the results of quantum measurements, a density matrix consistent with those measurement results is computed.
 When analyzing a system with many electrons, such as an atom or molecule, an imperfect but useful first approximation is to treat the electrons as uncorrelated or each having an independent single-particle wavefunction. This is the usual starting point when building the Slater determinant in the Hartree–Fock method. If there are  electrons filling the  single-particle wavefunctions , then the collection of  electrons together can be characterized by a density matrix .

C*-algebraic formulation of states 
It is now generally accepted that the description of quantum mechanics in which all self-adjoint operators represent observables is untenable.  For this reason, observables are identified with elements of an abstract C*-algebra A (that is one without a distinguished representation as an algebra of operators) and states are positive linear functionals on A. However, by using the GNS construction, we can recover Hilbert spaces which realize A as a subalgebra of operators.

Geometrically, a pure state on a C*-algebra A  is a state which is an extreme point of the set of all states on A.  By properties of the GNS construction these states correspond to irreducible representations of A.

The states of the C*-algebra of compact operators K(H) correspond exactly to the density operators, and therefore the pure states  of K(H) are exactly the pure states in the sense of quantum mechanics.

The C*-algebraic formulation can be seen to include both classical and quantum systems. When the system is classical, the algebra of observables become an abelian C*-algebra.  In that case the states become probability measures.

History 
The formalism of density operators and matrices was introduced in 1927 by John von Neumann and independently, but less systematically, by Lev Landau and later in 1946 by Felix Bloch.  Von Neumann introduced the density matrix in order to develop both quantum statistical mechanics and a theory of quantum measurements. The name density matrix itself relates to its classical correspondence to a phase-space probability measure (probability distribution of position and momentum) in classical statistical mechanics, which was introduced by Wigner in 1932.

In contrast, the motivation that inspired Landau was the impossibility of describing a subsystem of a composite quantum system by a state vector.

See also 

 Atomic electron transition
 Density functional theory
 Green–Kubo relations
 Green's function (many-body theory)
 Lindblad equation
 Wigner quasi-probability distribution

Notes and references 

Functional analysis
Quantum information science
Statistical mechanics
Lev Landau